Jurong is a geographical region in south-western Singapore.
Jurong East, a new town in the eastern Jurong
Jurong West, a new town in the western Jurong
Jurong Group Representation Constituency, the constituency that currently governs Jurong East
Jurong Single Member Constituency, a defunct constituency that governed parts of Jurong

Jurong may also refer to:
Jurong, Jiangsu, a city in Jiangsu, China
, a scrapped Singaporean coaster named after the Jurong region